The first series of Love Island began on 7 June 2015 with a live special of the show hosted by Caroline Flack on ITV2, and ended on 15 July 2015. It is the first from the revived series, but third overall. The series was narrated by Iain Stirling. The series aired every night of the week except Friday, however the Saturday episode was used as a weekly catch-up entitled Love Island: The Weekly Hot List rather than a nightly highlights episode. The average viewers for this series was 570,000.

On 15 July 2015 the series was won by Jess Hayes and Max Morley, with Hannah Elizabeth and Jon Clark as runners-up.

Islander Jon Clark later went onto appear as a cast member in The Only Way Is Essex, whilst both Josh Ritchie and Max Morley made appearances in Ex on the Beach. After finishing in fourth place, Cally and Luis became the first couple to have a baby as they welcomed their first child in May 2017.

Production
The first one-minute trailer for the series aired on 12 May 2015, confirming that the series would begin in June. Pictures of the villa were unveiled on 5 June 2015. The villa is located in Mallorca with 69 cameras watching the Islander's every move. It only includes double beds forcing them to share with each other, but has a special Hideaway bedroom for couples to spend the night away from the others.

Islanders
The Islanders for the first series were revealed on 2 June 2015, just days before the launch. However, throughout the series, more Islanders entered the villa to find love. Some Islanders were dumped from the island for either failing to couple up, some were voted off by their fellow Islanders, and others for receiving the fewest votes in public eliminations. The series was won by Jess and Max on 15 July 2015 after receiving 42% of the final vote, beating Hannah and Jon who received 36%, Lauren and Josh with 12%, and finally Cally and Luis who received 10%.

Coupling
The couples were chosen shortly after the Islanders entered the villa. After all of the boys entered, the girls were asked to choose a boy to pair up with. Jon was paired with Hannah, Chris was paired with Danielle, Omar and Rachel paired up, Josh and Lauren coupled up, whilst Jess paired herself with Jordan and Luis got with Zoe. They were competing in their pairs for £50,000. However, throughout the series the couples swapped and changed as the islanders re-coupled.

Notes

 : On Day 2, after Jess and Jordan won a challenge they were given the opportunity to swap two couples. Jess decided to couple up with Josh, leaving Jordan in a new couple with Lauren.
 : On Day 8, the Islanders were told that they were all single, but new girls Daisy and Naomi would get the chance to couple up with a boy of their choice after going on three dates. Daisy chose Jordan, and Naomi chose Josh respectively. 
 : On Day 15, the Islanders were told that once again they were all single, unless they wanted to announce that they are officially boyfriend and girlfriend. The only couples to do this were Hannah and Jon, and Naomi and Josh.

Guests
During the series a number of guests entered the villa. 
On 25 June 2015 it was announced that Calum Best would be returning to the series. On Day 24, he briefly entered to take the boys on a night out in Magaluf. This was Calum's third appearance on the show having previously appeared on the original series in 2005 where he finished in third place. He later returned for 2006 series where he was voted the winner alongside Bianca Gascoigne.
On 12 July 2015, it was announced that Mark Wright would be briefly entering the villa. He entered on Day 38 to become the DJ for Lauren's birthday party, he departed shortly after the party.

Weekly summary
The main events in the Love Island villa are summarised in the table below.

Ratings
Official ratings are taken from BARB but do not include +1. Because the Saturday episodes are weekly catch-up episodes rather than nightly highlights, these are not included in the overall averages.

References

2015 British television seasons
Love Island (2015 TV series)